Allan Dick may refer to:

Allan Dick (politician) (1915–1992), New Zealand politician
Allan Dick (field hockey) (born 1983), Scottish field hockey player
Allan Brugh Dick (1833–1926), a Scottish metallurgical chemist who first described the eponymous mineral dickite

See also
 List of people with surname Dick
 Dick Allen (disambiguation)